Margaret Christina Miller  (born 1955) is an archaeologist and the Arthur and Renee George Professor of Classical Archaeology at the University of Sydney.

Career 
Miller holds a BA from the University of British Columbia, a MA from Oxford University and an AM from Harvard University. Her 1985 PhD, also from Harvard, was titled "Perserie : the arts of the East in fifth-century Athens". She then continued her studies in the Classics at the American School of Classical Studies at Athens.

She has participated in archaeological digs in England, Egypt and Turkey and has been a team leader (2012) and co-director (2013, 2014, 2019) of the Zagora Archaeological Project, excavating at the coastal town of Zagora in Greece.

Before moving to the University of Sydney, where she is the Arthur and Renee George Professor of Classical Archaeology, Miller worked in Canada at McMaster University and the University of Toronto.

Miller was elected a Fellow of the Australian Academy of the Humanities in 2011 and the following year was made a Corresponding Member, German Archaeological Institute.

Selected publications

Books

References 

1955 births
Living people
University of British Columbia alumni
Alumni of the University of Oxford
Harvard University alumni
Academic staff of McMaster University
Academic staff of the University of Toronto
Academic staff of the University of Sydney
Canadian archaeologists
Fellows of the Australian Academy of the Humanities